Oleksiy Liubchenko (born September 21, 1971) is a Ukrainian politician who served as First Vice Prime Minister of Ukraine from May 20, 2021, to November 2021 and Ministry of Economy.

Personal life 
Liubchenko was born in the district of Horodyshche, Cherkasy Raion, Ukraine.

References 

1971 births
Living people
People from Cherkasy Oblast
21st-century Ukrainian politicians
Kyiv National Economic University alumni
Economy ministers of Ukraine
First vice prime ministers of Ukraine
Recipients of the Order of Merit (Ukraine), 3rd class